Les Canadiennes de Montréal  were a professional women's ice hockey team based in Montreal, Quebec, Canada. Founded in 2007 as the Montreal Stars (Stars de Montréal), they competed in the Canadian Women's Hockey League (CWHL) in every season. The team appeared in and won the Clarkson Cup the most times out of any CWHL teams with four championships.

In 2015, the team became an affiliate of the Montreal Canadiens of the National Hockey League, with the franchise providing resources and marketing support to the team as part of their efforts to help promote women's hockey. This affiliation also led to its re-branding as Les Canadiennes for the 2015–16 CWHL season, adopting colours and jerseys resembling those of their men's counterpart. In December 2015, the Canadiennes and the Boston Pride played the first outdoor game in women's hockey as part of festivities for the 2016 NHL Winter Classic in Foxborough, Massachusetts.

In 2019, the CWHL ceased operations, as well as all teams that it directly owned including Les Canadiennes.

Team history

Team origins
The Montreal Stars joined the CWHL during its formation in 2007. The Stars were formed from players from the Montreal Axion, a team that played in the National Women's Hockey League before its demise.

In their first season, 2007–08, Montreal won 23 games out of 30 regular season contests and finished first overall in the regular season, but lost to Mississauga Chiefs in the playoffs that year in a two-game contest.

In 2008–09, the Stars won the Clarkson Cup on March 19, 2009, in Kingston, Ontario, the first year that the Clarkson Cup was openly played for between competitive professional women's hockey clubs rather than national teams such as before with Team Canada and Team Sweden in 2006. The Clarkson Cup was won by Montreal by defeating the Minnesota Whitecaps in the final. Initially, the game was tied at one goal apiece until Montreal scored two goals. Sabrina Habrec ultimately scored the game winner, in a 3–1 final score. Former Canadian Governor General Adrienne Clarkson was on hand to present the trophy to team captain Lisa-Marie Breton-Lebreux. It was Adrienne Clarkson's hope that the Clarkson Cup be the women's equivalent to the Stanley Cup. That same season, three players were named to the First and Second team all stars: Caroline Ouellette, Kim St.Pierre and Sabrina Habrec.

The team had early success with league awards to its players. Kim St. Pierre won the CHWL's award for top goaltender in back-to-back seasons, 2007–08 and 2008–09. Caroline Ouellette was the CWHL MVP for the 2008–09, Marie-Phillip Poulin was the CWHL's rookie of the year in 2007–08 at the age of 16 scoring over 40 points in 16 games, and Sabrina Harbec led the CWHL in scoring with 54 points in 29 games that into the 2009–10 season. In 2009–10, the team finished in first place but did not defend the Clarkson Cup in the playoffs.

During the 2013–14 CWHL season, three members of the Stars reached the milestone of 100 career points during the season. It marks the first time in CWHL history that three players from the same franchise reach the century mark in the same season. It began on January 11, when CWHL co-founder Lisa-Marie Breton registered the 100th point of her career. On February 8, Vanessa Davidson earned the 100th point in her CWHL career and Emmanuelle Blais became the third in a March 8 match against the Boston Blades.

Montreal Canadiens partnership 
In March 2015, the Montreal Canadiens of the National Hockey League entered into a resource-sharing and marketing partnership with the Stars. Team CEO Geoff Molson explained that given the Canadiens' support of minor hockey in Quebec and the growth of Women's hockey, he felt that it "[was] the right time to concretely support women who play professional hockey, and, at the same time, promote the sport among up-and-coming players". Brenda Andress, commissioner of the CWHL, also stated that the partnership "affords the CWHL an opportunity to grow women's hockey hand in hand with one of the most storied franchises in professional sport."

In September 2015, the team unveiled a new identity as Les Canadiennes, adopting a rounded "C" and star as its logo (alluding to the Canadiens' logo, and the team's former name), and a blue-white-red kit similar to that of the Canadiens.

In a game against the Brampton Thunder on December 13, 2015, Noemie Marin registered the 200th point of her CWHL career. She would record two assists in the game, including one on the game-winning tally, to reach the milestone.

On December 10, 2016, Les Canadiennes played a regular season game against the Calgary Inferno at the Bell Centre. They beat the Inferno 1–0, with the goal by captain Marie-Philip Poulin, in regulation in front of nearly 6000 spectators, marking a great success for the first ever CWHL hockey game to be played at the home of the Montreal Canadiens.

On December 11, 2016, Caroline Ouellette, already the league's all-time leader in points and assists, registered her 300th career point. She then tied Jayna Hefford's league record of 130 goals on January 29, 2017, finishing the season with 309 career points and 130 career goals.

In 2018, Les Canadiennes moved team operations to the home arena of the Montreal Canadiens' American Hockey League affiliate, the Laval Rocket. Les Canadiennes then scheduled some of their home games at Place Bell for the 2018–19 season.

2016 Outdoor Women's Winter Classic 
On December 31, 2015, the Canadiennes participated in an outdoor game, the 2016 Outdoor Women's Classic, against the Boston Pride of the National Women's Hockey League (NWHL) at Gillette Stadium in Foxborough, Massachusetts. The game was held as an undercard to the following day's NHL Winter Classic, which featured their teams' NHL counterparts—the Canadiens and the Boston Bruins, and was the first ever outdoor professional women's hockey game.

Olympics

The team included notable forwards Caroline Ouellette, Sarah Vaillancourt and goaltender Kim St. Pierre, all members of the 2010 Canadian Women's Hockey Olympic team who won the Olympic gold medal in Vancouver.

For the 2014 Sochi Winter Games, Stars players Ouellette, Haley Irwin, Charline Labonté and Catherine Ward competed for Team Canada, while Julie Chu was a member of Team USA.

After the 2018 Winter Games, Hilary Knight signed as a free agent with Les Canadiennes on March 8, 2018, joining the team for the 2018 Clarkson Cup playoffs.

Social work
Les Canadiennes support the fight against breast cancer with a Breast Cancer Fundraising event. For the occasion, Les Canadiennes play with pink jerseys at their annual breast cancer fundraiser. Les Canadiennes are also committed to supporting amateur girls' hockey teams and take their role as examples to the young girls growing up playing the sport, very seriously. The "Canadiennes Camps" are just one way that these athletes connect with young players. They are also available to meet the girls at the autograph sessions following most of their games, they are accessible through social media, and many of them are involved in various community outreach events and school girls' hockey teams.

Seasons
Les Canadiennes won a total of eight regular season championships and four Clarkson Cups in 12 seasons. From 2012 to 2019, the Clarkson Cup has been awarded to the CWHL playoff champion after previously being awarded to the top women's hockey team in Canada when there was multiple leagues.

Season-by-season

Note: GP = Games played, W = Wins, L = Losses, T = Ties, OTL = Overtime losses, GF = Goals for, GA = Goals against, Pts = Points.

2018-19 roster
Updated October 2, 2018.

|}

Awards and honours
 CWHL Chairman's Trophy: 2007–08, 2008–09, 2009–10, 2010–11, 2011–12, 2013–14, 2015–16.
 Jayna Hefford Trophy: 
 2015–16, 2016–17: Marie-Philip Poulin
 CWHL Most Valuable Player:
 2008–09, 2010–11: Caroline Ouellette
 2009–10: Sabrina Harbec
 2011–12: Meghan Agosta
 2013–14: Ann-Sophie Bettez
 2015–16, 2016-17: Marie-Philip Poulin
 Angela James Bowl :
 2009–10: Sabrina Harbec
 2010–11: Caroline Ouellette
 2011–12, 2012-13: Meghan Agosta
 2013–14: Ann-Sophie Bettez
 2015–16, 2016–17 (co-winner): Marie-Philip Poulin
 CWHL Coach of the Year:
 2014–15: Dany Brunet
 CWHL Goals Leader:
 2009–10: Noémie Marin
 2012–13, 2013–14, 2016–17: Ann-Sophie Bettez
 2015–16: Marie-Philip Poulin
 CWHL Assists Leader:
 2008–09, 2010-11: Caroline Ouellette
 2009–10: Sabrina Harbec
 2011–12, 2012-13: Meghan Agosta
 2013–14, 2015-16: Ann-Sophie Bettez
 2016–17: Marie-Philip Poulin
 CWHL Top Forward:
 2009–10: Sabrina Harbec
 2010–11: Caroline Ouellette
 2011–12: Meghan Agosta
 2013–14: Ann-Sophie Bettez
 2015–16, 2016–17: Marie-Philip Poulin
 CWHL Top Defender:
 2009–10: Annie Guay
 2011–12, 2012-13: Catherine Ward
 2013–14: Cathy Chartrand
 CWHL Top Goaltender:
 2007–08, 2008–09, 2010–11: Kim St-Pierre
 2014–15, 2015–16, 2016–17: Charline Labonté
 CWHL Outstanding Rookie:
 2007–08: Marie-Philip Poulin
 2010–11: Sarah Vaillancourt
 2012–13: Ann-Sophie Bettez
 Humanitarian of the Year Award:
 2015–16: Lisa-Marie Breton-Lebreux
 Cathy Chartrand, 2012–13 and 2013–14 leading scorer among CWHL defenders

Captains

Scoring leaders

Season-by-season

See also
 2010–11 Montreal Stars season
 2011–12 Montreal Stars season
 Montreal Axion

References

Other sources
 Montreal 2011 Clarkson Cup Champions, March 27, 2011.
 Montreal wins Clarkson Cup. March 28, 2011. 
 St-Pierre backstops Montreal to Clarkson Cup title  in CBC news, March 27, 2011.
 Montreal Stars win women's national hockey championship, in CBC news, March 21, 2009.
 First Clarkson Cup stays in Canada, Slam sports, March 22, 2009.
 McGill grads help Stars capture Clarkson Cup McGill newspaper, March 21, 2009
  Stars de Montréal old blog

External links

 

 
Montreal Canadiens
Canadian Women's Hockey League teams
Stars
Women's ice hockey teams in Canada
Women in Quebec
2007 establishments in Quebec
2019 disestablishments in Quebec
Ice hockey clubs established in 2007
Ice hockey clubs disestablished in 2019